West Park Mall is an enclosed shopping mall in Cape Girardeau, Missouri. Opened in 1981, it is anchored by JCPenney, Ashley HomeStore, Old Navy, and Barnes & Noble.

History
The mall was built in 1981 by a partnership between St. Louis-based May Centers, Inc., and Cape Girardeau-based Drury Development Corp., developer of the Drury Hotel Chain, It featured Famous-Barr (later Macy's) and JCPenney as its anchor stores, with original tenants including Hallmark Cards, Foot Locker, Kay-Bee Toys, Claire's, Zales Jewelers, GNC, Waldenbooks, and Lerner New York. An  Venture was added as a third anchor in 1984. Westfield Group bought the mall from CenterMark in 1993, and renamed it Westfield Shoppingtown West Park in 1998.

The Venture store closed in 1998, the same year in which the mall owners proposed adding a fourth anchor store. The West Park Mall Venture store and another at Kentucky Oaks Mall in nearby Paducah, Kentucky both became Shopko in 1999, bringing West Park to 100 percent occupancy for the first time in its history. Shopko closed in 2001.

Old Navy opened in the mall in 2004. A year later, the former Venture and Shopko space became Steve & Barry's. In 2006, Westfield sold the mall to Centro Watt (which in 2011 rebranded as Brixmor Property Group), who reverted it to its original name. Barnes & Noble was also added.

Several stores closed in the mall between 2008 and 2010, including Steve & Barry's, Pacific Sunwear, Tilt, (a video arcade that was originally called "The Gold Mine" in the 1980s,) and a restaurant which had been at the mall for 24 years. Despite these vacancies, the mall was 88 percent occupied in 2010, with several of its original stores still in operation. Brixmor hired Madison Marquette to be the manager of the mall in mid-2012.

Ashley Furniture opened in 2018 in the former Venture building.

On January 5, 2021, it was announced that Macy's would be closing as part of a plan to close 46 stores nationwide. The store closed on March 21, 2021.

References

External links
Official website

Buildings and structures in Cape Girardeau, Missouri
Shopping malls in Missouri
Shopping malls established in 1981
1981 establishments in Missouri